Erich Koschik (January 3, 1913 - July 21, 1985) was a German flatwater canoeist who competed in the late 1930s. At the 1936 Summer Olympics in Berlin, he won a bronze medal in the C-1 1000 m event.

References
DatabaseOlympics.com profile
Sports-reference.com profile

1913 births
1985 deaths
Canoeists at the 1936 Summer Olympics
German male canoeists
Olympic canoeists of Germany
Olympic bronze medalists for Germany
Olympic medalists in canoeing
Medalists at the 1936 Summer Olympics